Allahabad High Court, also known as High Court of Judicature at Allahabad is the high court based in Allahabad (also known as Prayagraj) that has jurisdiction over the Indian state of Uttar Pradesh. It was established on 17 March 1866, making it one of the oldest high courts to be established in India.

History
Allahabad became the seat of Government of North-Western Provinces and a High Court was established in 1834 but was shifted to Agra within a year. In 1875 it shifted back to Allahabad. The former High Court was located at the Accountant General's office at the University of Allahabad complex.

It was founded as the High Court of Judicature for the North-Western Provinces at Agra on 17 March 1866 by the Indian High Courts Act 1861 replacing the old Sadr Diwani Adalat. Sir Walter Morgan, Barrister-at-Law and Mr. Simpson were appointed the first Chief Justice and the first Registrar respectively of the High Court of North-Western Provinces.

The location of the High Court for the North-Western Provinces was shifted from Agra to Allahabad in 1875 and the name was correspondingly changed to the High Court of Judicature at Allahabad from 11 March 1919.

On 2 November 1925, the Oudh Judicial Commissioner's Court was replaced by the Oudh Chief Court at Lucknow by the Oudh Civil Courts Act of 1925, enacted by the United Provinces Legislature with the previous sanction of the Governor General and the passing of this Act.

On 25 February 1948, the Chief Court of Oudh was amalgamated with the High Court of Allahabad.

When the state of Uttaranchal, now known as Uttarakhand, was carved out of Uttar Pradesh in 2000, this high court ceased to have jurisdiction over the districts falling in Uttaranchal.

Allahabad High Court was built by Khan Saheb Nizamuddin of Loha Mundi, Agra. He also donated the water fountain to the High Court.

Principal seat and benches
The seat of the court is at Allahabad. Allahabad High Court maintains a permanent circuit bench at Lucknow, the administrative capital of the state. The maximum number of serving judges is 160, the highest in India.

Chief Justice
Justice Pritinker Diwaker is the current Acting Chief Justice of the High Court.

List of Chief Justices

The Chief Justice and the Judges 
The court has a Sanctioned strength of 160 (Permanent:120, Additional:40) judges.

Judges elevated to the Supreme Court of India-

Sitting Judges of Allahabad High Court-

Reporting and citation 
Journals that report Allahabad High Court Judgements include 
 Allahabad Criminal Cases, 
  Allahabad Law Journal
  Allahabad Law Reports
  Allahabad Daily Judgement
  Allahabad Civil Journal
  Allahabad Weekly Cases
  Allahabad Rent Cases
  Accidents Claims Journal
  Allahabad Criminal Rulings
  Criminal Law Journal
  Motor Accident Claims
  Revenue Decisions
  U.P. Local Bodies and Education Cases
  Lucknow Civil Decisions (LCD)
  All India Judicial Interpretation on Crimes

High Court Service 
The Office staff at High Court of Judicature at Allahabad is broadly divided into five Cadres:
 General office Cadre(Registrar Cadre)
An officer enters this cadre in the rank of Review Officer/Asst. Review Officer/Computer Assistant after passing a competitive exam and rises up through successive promotions on S.O./Asst./Deputy/Joint Registrar to reach the post of Registrar. 
 Bench Secretary Cadre
 Private Secretary Cadre
 Computer Cadre
 Library Cadre
Some other cadres/posts at High Court of Judicature at Allahabad are - 
 Chief Documentation Officer cum Chief Librarian (currently held by Sri. Amitabh Saran)
 Physiotherapist
 Court Manger

Commemorative Postal Stamps
Commemorative stamps released by India Post -

References

Cited sources

External links

 Official website
 History of Allahabad High Court

 
Advocate General Uttar Pradesh
Courts and tribunals established in 1866
1866 establishments in India